Nathaniel Thomas Allen Fiennes, 21st Baron Saye and Sele, DL (born 22 September 1920), styled as Lord Saye and Sele, is an English peer, businessman, former chartered surveyor, and retired British Army officer.

Biography
Twisleton-Wykeham-Fiennes was born on 22 September 1920, the son of Ivo Murray Twisleton-Wykeham-Fiennes, 20th Baron Saye and Sele, and Hersey Cecilia Hester Butler. Despite a family connection with Winchester College, he was educated at Eton and then at New College, Oxford. During the Second World War he served in the Rifle Brigade (Prince Consort's Own). He received an emergency commission in the Rifle Brigade on 19 April 1941, and was promoted war-substantive lieutenant on 1 October 1942 and temporary captain on 3 September 1943. In March 1945, he was mentioned in dispatches for service in North-West Europe.

His brother, Ingel, was killed on 30 August 1941 when his Wellington bomber was shot down. His other brother was Oliver William Twisleton-Wykeham-Fiennes (1926-2011), later Dean of Lincoln (1969–89).

In April 1945 Twisleton-Wykeham-Fiennes and his regiment, the 8th Battalion of the Rifle Brigade, were among the first troops to reach Bergen-Belsen concentration camp.  In 2020 he recalled for the Daily Telegraph, "We turned down a small track, and it opened into a sight you would never want to see again ... People being chopped up, people on the ground, pits with three or four hundred dead bodies in each ... It was like something from a nightmare, and the smell was overpowering."  He met with Bergen-Belsen survivor Mala Tribich (originally from Piotrków Trybunalski, Poland) at his family seat, Broughton Castle, shortly before the 75th anniversary of the liberation of the camp, and was ready "to grovel before [Tribich], because I have such a respect and admiration for her.  She is the most remarkable lady ... all these survivors are."  Tribich, who was 14 and ill with typhus when Bergen-Belsen was liberated, had previously survived the ghetto in her hometown and Ravensbrück concentration camp.

After the war, Fiennes remained in the army, receiving promotion to war-substantive captain and temporary major on 15 January 1946. On 22 May 1948, he received a regular commission as a lieutenant in the Rifle Brigade (seniority from 22 May 1943), with promotion to captain effective from the same date (seniority from 22 November 1947). He was stationed in Palestine during the Palestine Emergency in 1946-47, for which he was again mentioned in dispatches in January 1949. He resigned his commission on 8 February 1950, leaving with the honorary rank of major.

Fiennes was a trustee of the Ernest Cook Trust, which works for the preservation of English country houses and estates, from 1959 until 1995, serving as chairman from 1964 until 1990. In 1965 he changed his surname by Deed poll to Fiennes thereby relinquishing the surnames Twisleton and Wykeham.

When his father died on 21 October 1968, Fiennes succeeded him as 21st Baron Saye and Sele. He was a Fellow of Winchester College between 1967 and 1983. He became a Chartered Surveyor and was a partner of a company called Laws and Fiennes before becoming a regional director within Lloyds Bank (1983–90). Since 1979 he has been a Deputy Lieutenant (DL) of Oxfordshire.

Lord Saye and Sele is known as Nat to his family and friends. He is the father of the author William Fiennes and of the artist Susannah Fiennes.

Marriage and children
Lord Saye and Sele married Mariette Helena Salisbury-Jones (born 1935), the daughter of Major-General Sir Arthur Guy Salisbury-Jones in 1958. Together they had five children:

 Hon Richard Ingel Fiennes (born 19 August 1959, died 13 April 2001)
 Hon Martin Guy Fiennes (born 27 February 1961)
 Hon Susannah Hersey Fiennes (born 27 February 1961)
 Hon Thomas Nathaniel Fiennes (born 11 October 1965, died 3 September 1968)
 Hon William John Fiennes (born 7 August 1970)

Notes

References

Links and sources
RootsWeb
RootsWeb
Fiennes Times
Val Bourne, 'Broughton Castle: a garden for poets – and film stars', The Daily Telegraph, 22 May 1999
Debrett's People of Today (12th edn, London, 1999), p. 1739

1920 births
Living people
Free Foresters cricketers
People educated at Eton College
Alumni of New College, Oxford
English bankers
British Army personnel of World War II
British military personnel of the Palestine Emergency
Rifle Brigade officers
Nathaniel
English surveyors
Deputy Lieutenants of Oxfordshire
English cricketers
Oxfordshire cricketers
English centenarians
Men centenarians
Barons Saye and Sele
Saye and Sele